Kehoe is an Irish clan name.

Kehoe may also refer to:

Kehoe Field, American athletic venues
Kehoe Cup, an Irish hurling competition

See also

Senator Kehoe (disambiguation)
Keogh (disambiguation)
Keoghan (surname)
Keohane (disambiguation)
Keough (disambiguation)
McKeogh
McKeough (disambiguation)